The Duck candlestick or candelabra with ducks and felines is an object of Islamic art, in hammered and embossed copper alloy, with an inlaid decoration of silver and red copper. It was produced in the medieval Iranian world in the 12th century, during the Seljuk and Ghurid eras. It is one of the masterpieces of the Islamic Arts Department of the Louvre Museum.

History 
The work has no date, no signature, no place of manufacture, or the name of the sponsor. According to Annabelle Collinet, the candlestick was probably created in Herat in the second half of the 12th century; this opinion is widely shared even if a previous study indicated that, taking into account the decoration of the dimples with solar motifs, frequent in the west of the Iranian world, it was possible that the candlestick was created in western Iran by an artist originating from Greater Khorasan. Based on similar craftsmanship or decorations, it is possible that the sponsors were dignitaries of the Ghorid dynasty.

An identical candlestick, with which he probably formed a pair, is kept at the Islamic Museum of Cairo, this pair may be intended to be placed in a monument or an important place.Another, similar but not identical in its method of elaboration (the ducks in the round are not made in repoussé), is in the al-Sabah collection in Kuwait. The work was exhibited in May-June 1903 at the Musée des Arts décoratifs, Paris during the great "exhibition of Muslim arts". It is described as follows in the catalog of the exhibition: “Chandelier decorated with two friezes of small seated lions in embossed relief, separated by a frieze of floral ornaments in relief. 

In 1699, it belonged to an Armenian owner who offered it to his church.The work was exhibited in May-June 1903 at the Musée des Arts décoratifs during the great "exhibition of Muslim arts".

Description 
Gaston Migeon presented the work in 1903 as follows: "It is impossible to forget, had we seen it only once, this extraordinary candlestick, squat in shape, with its crown of birds on the shoulder. In the round, all facing outwards as if ready to take flight, and its two circular friezes, on the body, of seated lions, hieratic, separated by a wide band of bosses. The piece has altogether a character of harshness and incredible majesty.

Dating 
The art of embossed and inlaid metal in medieval Iran experienced a notable development from the middle of the 12th century.

References 

Islamic art
Islamic art of the Louvre